FC Türkiyemspor was a Dutch football club based in Amsterdam which was active from 1987 to 2009 when the club went bankrupt. The club quickly rose through the ranks of amateur football, winning four promotions between 1996 and 2002. Türkiyemspor won the Hoofdklasse title in its maiden season in 2002/03 and successfully defended the championship the year after. In 2004/05, Türkiyemspor were runners-up, only to regain the title the following season.

Change came when entrepreneur and chairman Nedim Imaç was assassinated on February 17, 2007. A week after his death, newspaper De Telegraaf reported that Imaç had been involved in heroin trade. Imaç was the club's biggest sponsor and his death led to financial troubles. Bills were unpaid and the club was on the verge of collapse. An attempt to make a new start appeared successful, but in February 2009, Türkiyemspor went bankrupt and was dissolved.

Former managers
 Robert Verbeek
 John de Wolf

See also
Turks in the Netherlands
Croydon Athletic F.C., another club that was dissolved due to similar issues.

References

External links
 Official website

 
Defunct football clubs in the Netherlands
Football clubs in Amsterdam
Association football clubs established in 1987
Association football clubs disestablished in 2009
1987 establishments in the Netherlands
2009 disestablishments in the Netherlands
Turkish association football clubs outside Turkey